"Macbeth" is a 1965 Australian TV production of the play by William Shakespeare. The play had previously been filmed by the ABC in 1960 with Keith Goodlet in the title role.

Cast
Wynn Roberts as Macbeth
Terri Aldred as Lady Macbeth
Keith Eden as Macduff
Keith Lee as Banquo
Clark Bleazby as Ross
Allan Lander as Lennox
Mark Albiston as Malcolm
Michael Duffield as Seyton
Peter Hepworth as Fleance
Joan Harris as Lady Macduff
Patricia Kennedy, Roma Johnston and Agnes Dobson as the witches
Sydney Conabere, Lloyd Cunningham, Nevil Thurgood as murderers

Production
The production was directed by Alan Burke who said, "I always approach Shakespeare with reverence, but not with awe. Someone once said, 'A producer should read every new play as if it were Shakespeare, and Shakespeare as if it were a new play.' I heartily agree with this.... The main value of the play is inside the minds of its characters. TV, with its revealing close-ups, is the ideal medium with which to demonstrate this."

It was set in the year the play was written, around 1600, rather than when Shakespeare originally set it, around 1100. This meant the characters wore traditional tartans. "Our aim was authenticity," said Burke. "Every detail was thoroughly researched - the tartans, costumes and swords. The atmosphere of a battle in the eeriness of a misty forest could not have possibly be recreated in  a studio. But we found the perfect location for it in Mount Macedon."

The final battle was shot in Mount Macedon over two days involving cast and crew of 83 in all. Wardrobe managed Keith Clarke said "the kilts had to be carefully planned and supervised, otherwise with 30 men fighting enthusiastically  we could have ended up with a few nasty accidents."

The bulk of filming was done at the ABC studios in Ripponlea, Melbourne.

Trevor Ling was the designer.

Reception
The Age called it "ambitious and, generally, extremely competent. It was an encouraging experiment in what can be done to popularise Shakespeare."

References

External links
 

1965 television plays
1965 Australian television episodes
1960s Australian television plays
Wednesday Theatre (season 1) episodes